Erra Mandaram ( Red Hibiscus) is a 1991 Telugu film, produced by Pokuri Venkateswara Rao under the Eetharam Films banner and directed by Muthyala Subbaiah. It stars Rajendra Prasad, Yamuna  and music composed by Chakravarthy. The entire movie was shot in a remote village. The film was remade in Oriya as Udandi Sita starring Aparijita Mohanty, in Tamil as Puthiya Parasakthi starring Selva and Suganya and in Kannada as Balarama (2002) starring Rockline Venkatesh. The film won four Nandi Awards.

Plot
Ramudu (Rajendra Prasad) plays an uneducated and innocent person working in a theatre. Arundhati (Yamuna) loves Ramudu and marries him. Due to reservation system provided by the Government for the post of Panchayat President, Ramudu has elected as the President of Gram panchayat by the village people under the head of a landlord, Jagganna Dora (Devaraj). Jagganna Dora later reveals his intention of selecting Ramudu as president as he is innocent and can be made a puppet in his hands. Ramudu wants to reform his village but is left helpless as he lacks courage. Later one day, he feels ashamed of himself for being so powerless and unable to stop the crimes committed by Dora. He revolts, which results in his arrest with false accusations and is killed by  Dora's men after he returns from the police station. The police take  Dora's side and close the case, reporting that the person killed was someone other than Ramudu. Finally, Dora is then murdered by Arundhati and her son, both of whom allege the murder was committed by Ramudu, who is still said to be alive by the police. The movie ends with Arundhati and her son walking free.

Cast
Rajendra Prasad as Ramudu
Yamuna as Arundhati
Devaraj as Jagganna Dora
P. L. Narayana as Babai, Retired Army Soldier
Sakshi Ranga Rao as Poojari
Narra Venkateswara Rao as Posukolu
Sanjeevi
Jayalalita as Kotamma
Sailaja as Jagganna Dora's wife

Soundtrack

Music composed by Chakravarthy. Music released on Cauvery Audio Company.

Awards
Nandi Awards
 Best Feature Film - Gold - P. Venkateswara Rao
 Best Actor - Rajendra Prasad
 Best Villain - Devaraj
 Best Lyricist - Jaladi Raja Rao

References

External links
 

1990s Telugu-language films
1990 films
Films scored by K. Chakravarthy
Telugu films remade in other languages
Films directed by Muthyala Subbaiah